Karin Daughter of Ingmar is a 1920 Swedish silent drama film directed by Victor Sjöström. It is the second part in Sjöström's large-scale adaption of Selma Lagerlöf's novel Jerusalem, following Sons of Ingmar from the year before, and depicting chapter three and four from the novel. The critical reception was, however, unenthusiastic, and Sjöström decided to not direct any more parts. Eventually the suite was finished by Gustaf Molander in 1926.

Cast
 Victor Sjöström as Ingmar
 Tora Teje as Karin Ingmarsdotter
 Bertil Malmstedt as Lill-Ingmar
 Tor Weijden as Halfvor
 Nils Lundell as Eljas Elof Ersson
 Carl Browallius as Eljas' father
 Josua Bengtsson as Eljas' friend
 Nils Ahrén as Berger Sven Persson
 Olof Ås as Inspector
 Eric Gustafson as Innkeeper's Son
 Emil Fjellström as Stark-Ingmar
 Paul Hallström

References

External links
 

1920 films
1920 drama films
Swedish black-and-white films
Films based on works by Selma Lagerlöf
Films directed by Victor Sjöström
Swedish silent feature films
1920s Swedish-language films
Swedish drama films
Silent drama films
1920s Swedish films